This is a list of schools in Xicheng District, Beijing.

Secondary schools
Note: In China the word 中学 zhōngxué, literally translated as "middle school", refers to any secondary school and differs from the American usage of the term "middle school" to mean specifically a lower secondary school or junior high school. 初中 chū​zhōng is used to refer to a lower secondary school.

 Asia-Pacific Experimental School of Beijing Normal University (北京师范大学亚太实验学校)
  (Main Campus, and South Site 南址)
 
 Beijing No. 4 High School (Main Campus, East Campus 东校区, Guangwai Campus 广外校区, and Fuxingmen International Campus 复兴门国际校区)
 Beijing No. 7 High School (北京市第七中学)
 Beijing No. 8 High School (Main Campus 本部, Baiwanzhuang Campus 百万庄校区, Baiyunguan Campus 白云观校区, Dongli Campus 东里校区, Muxidi Campus 木樨地校区, and Xili Campus 西里校区)
 
  (Junior High School Division, and Senior High School Division 高中部)
 
  (separate campuses for Junior and Senior High School divisions and the international division )
 
 
 Beijing No. 43 Middle School (北京市第四十三中学) (East Site 东址 and West Site 西址)
 Beijing No. 56 High School (北京市第五十六中学)
  (North Site 北址 and South Site 南址)
 
  (North Campus 北校区, Middle Campus 中校区, South Campus 南校区, and Branch Campus 分校)
 Beijing Beiwei Road High School (北京市北纬路中学)
 Beijing Institute Education Affiliated High School (北京教育学院附属中学)
  (Longquan Campus 龙泉校区)
 Beijing EBSNU HuaXia Girls' Middle School (北京师范大学实验华夏女子中学)
 Beijing Experimental Vocational School (北京市实验职业学校) (Main Campus and East Campus, 东校区)
 Beijing Foreign Affairs Secondary School (北京市外事学校)
 
 
 Beijing Sanfan Middle School (北京市三帆中学) (Main Campus and Yuzhong Campus, 裕中校区)
 Beijing Shimei Vocational School (北京市实美职业学校) (Main Campus, Baiwanzhuang Campus 百万庄校区, and Ande Road Campus 安德路校区)
 Beijing Xicheng District Yuhua Secondary School (北京市西城区育华中学)
 Beijing Xicheng Vocational School (北京西城职业学校) ( Campus, 西便门校区）
 
 Beijing Yuetan High School (北京市月坛中学)
 Experimental High School Attached to Beijing Normal University
 The Foreign Language Experimental School of Xuanwu, Beijing (北京市宣武外国语实验学校)
 The Experimental Er Long Lu Middle School Attached to Beijing Normal University (北京师范大学实验二龙路中学)
 The High School Affiliated to Beijing Normal University (Main Campus, and Branch Campus 分校)
 Second High School Attached to Beijing Normal University (Main Campus, International Campus 国际部, and Xicheng Experimental School 西城实验学校)

Primary schools

 Asia-Pacific Experimental School of Beijing Normal University (北京师范大学亚太实验学校)
 Beijing City Sanfan Middle School Affiliated Primary School (北京市三帆中学附属小学)
 Beijing City Xicheng District Beilishi Road No. 1 Primary School (北京市西城区北礼士路第一小学)
 Beijing City Xicheng District Liuyinjie Primary School (北京市西城区柳荫街小学) - Daxiangfeng Site (大翔凤址) and Meichang Hutong Site (煤厂胡同址)
 Beijing City Xicheng District Shunchengjie No. 1 Primary School (北京市西城区顺城街第一小学)
 Beijing City Xicheng District Ya'er Hutong Primary School (北京市西城区鸦儿胡同小学} - North Campus (北校区) and South Campus (南校区)
 Beijing City Xicheng District Yumin Primary School (北京市西城区育民小学) - North School Site (北校址) and South School Site (南校址)
 Beijing Lei Feng Primary School (北京雷锋小学) (Main Campus and Dongjie Campus 东街校区)
 Beijing Primary School
 Guang'anmen Nei Branch School (北京小学广安门内分校)
 Hongshan Branch School (北京小学红山分校)
 Tianning Temple Branch School (北京小学天宁寺分校) (East Site (东址) and West Site (西址))
  (北京第一实验小学) - Guangwai Campus (广外校区), Hepingmen Branch Campus (和平门校区), Hufangqiao Campus (虎坊桥校区), Qianmen Branch Campus (前门分校)
 
 Shoushuihe Branch School (涭水河分校) - Original Location and current interim location
 Baiyun Road Branch School (白云路分校)
 Chang'an Campus (长安校区)
 Desheng Campus (德胜校区)
 Guangwai Branch School (广外分校)
 Wangfu Campus (王府校区)
 Xinwenhuajie Campus (新文化街校区)
 Yutaoyuan Campus (学玉桃园分校)
 Beijing No. 2 Experimental Primary School (北京第二实验小学) - 
 Beijing No. 8 High School Affiliated Primary School (北京市第八中学附属小学)
 Beijing No. 15 Middle School Affiliated Primary School (北京市第十五中学附属小学)
 Beijing Normal University Jingshi Affiliated Primary School (北京师范大学京师附小) - Original Campus (本校), Branch Campus 1 (一分校), Branch Campus 2 (二分校), and Branch Campus 3 (三分校)
 Beijing Xicheng District Chunshuguan Primary School (北京市西城区椿树馆小学)
 Beijing Xicheng District Denglai Primary School (北京市西城区登莱小学)
 Beijing Xicheng District Honglian Primary School (北京市西城区红莲小学)
 Beijing City Xuanwu Hui Ethnicity Primary School (北京市宣武回民小学) - Lower Elementary Campus (低年级部) and Upper Elementary Campus (高年级部) 
 Beijing City Xuanwu Normal (Teacher Training) School Affiliated No. 1 Primary School (北京市宣武师范学校附属第一小学) - Main Campus (本校), Liren Campus (里仁校区), and Youan Campus (右安校区)
  (Main Campus and Taiping Road Campus (太平街校区))
 Xicheng District Baizhifang Primary School (西城区白纸坊小学)
 Xicheng District Beichang Road Primary School (西城区北长街小学)
 Xicheng District Changqiao Primary School (西城区厂桥小学) (North Site (北址) and South Site (南址))
 Xicheng District China-Cuba Friendship Primary School (西城区中古友谊小学) - Nanlishi Road Campus (南礼士路校区) and Sanlihe Campus (三里河校区)
 Xicheng District Experimental Primary School (西城区实验小学)
 Xicheng District Fendou Primary School (西城区奋斗小学) - East Site (东址), North Site (北址), and West Site (西址)
 Xicheng District Fuchengmenwai No. 1 Primary School (西城区阜成门外第一小学)
 Xicheng District Fuxingmenwai No. 1 Primary School (西城区复兴门外第一小学) - Lower Campus (低年级部) and Upper Campus (高年级部)
 Xicheng District Hongmiao Primary School (西城区宏庙小学)
 Xicheng District Huajia Primary School (西城区华嘉小学) - West Campus (西校区) and East Campus (东校区)
 Xicheng District Huangchenggen Primary School - Main Site (本址), Houguangping Campus (后广平校区), Guangyuan Campus (官园校区), and Yuyou Campus (育幼校区)
 Xicheng District Jinbu Primary School (西城区进步小学)
 Xicheng District Lixue Primary School (西城区力学小学)
 Xicheng District New Century Experimental Primary School (西城区新世纪实验小学)
 Xicheng District Normal (Teacher Training) School Affiliated Primary School (西城区师范学校附属小学) - Liupukang Campus (六铺炕校区) and Zhanlan Road Campus (展览路校区)
 Xicheng District Qingnianhu Primary School (西城区青年湖小学)
 Xicheng District Sanlihe No. 3 Primary School (西城区三里河第三小学) - North Site (北址) and South Site (南址)
 Xicheng District Sanyili Primary School (西城区三义里小学) - Sanyili 4th Site (三义里4号址) and Sanyili 5th Site (三义里5号址)
 Xicheng District Shichahai Primary School (西城区什刹海小学) - Original Campus (本校) and Branch Campus (分校)
 Xicheng District Tan'er Hutong Primary School (西城区炭儿胡同小学) - In Dashilan Subdistrict
 Xicheng District Taoranting Primary School (西城区陶然亭小学)
 Xicheng District Xiangchang Road Primary School (西城区香厂路小学) - Original Campus (本校) and Branch Campus (分校)
 Xicheng District Wulutong Primary School (西城区五路通小学) - Main Campus and Education College Campus (教育学院校区)
 Xicheng District Xidan Primary School (西城区西单小学)
 Xicheng District Xishiku Primary School (西城区西什库小学)
 Xicheng District Yuxiang Primary School (西城区育翔小学) - Madian Principal Campus (马甸总校区), Deshengli Campus (德胜里校区), and Yangguang Campus (阳光校区)
 Xicheng District Zhicheng Primary School (西城区志成小学) - South Site (南址) and West Site (西址)
 Xicheng District Zizhong Primary School (西城区自忠小学) - Main Campus (本校) and Branch Campus (分校)
 Xicheng Normal (Teacher Training) Primary School (西城师范附小)
 Zhanlan Road No. 1 Primary School (展览路第一小学) - Main Campus and Branch Campus (分校)

References

 
Xicheng
Schools